Eddie Fowlkes (born December 24, 1962) is an American techno DJ. He was influential to the early Detroit techno scene.

Biography 
Eddie Fowlkes was born on December 24, 1962, in Detroit, Michigan. After attending a 1978 Charivari party with his older sisters where he saw DJ Darryl Shannon mixing records, Fowlkes requested a mixer for Christmas and then made his DJ debut in the late 70s. He was part of Juan Atkins's Deep Space DJ collective which included Art Payne, Keith Martin, and Derrick May who was also Fowlkes's roommate. In the 1980s, Fowlkes performed with three turntables, a mixer, wah-wah pedal and the 808 & 909 drum machines.

Kevin Saunderson said that seeing Fowlkes DJ at a fraternity party inspired him to get involved in the Deep Space Crew and become a better DJ.

After hearing a Cybotron performance, Fowlkes moved from being interested solely in DJing to creating his own records. Borrowing equipment from Atkins, he trained his ear and taught himself to play the keyboard over a couple of months. While Fowlkes and May were roommates, Fowlkes built his studio in his bedroom and started working on his first record. His first release under his own name was issued in 1986. That release on Metroplex Records, "Goodbye Kiss", helped establish what would come to be known as Detroit techno.

With the 1991 M.I.D release of Detroit techno soul, Fowlkes introduced the concept of Techno soul because "Detroit ... is both house heads and techno heads." Then followed the 1993 Tresor release The Birth of Technosoul, with 3MB (Moritz von Oswald and Thomas Fehlmann).

Eddie Fowlkes's handprints are cemented on the Detroit Historical Museum's Legends Plaza as a techno music pioneer.

Discography 

 EP (12") City Boy 
 Night Creepin' (12") Simply Soul 
 Goodbye Kiss (12") Metroplex 1986 
 Get It Live / In The Mix (12") Metroplex 1987 
 Goodbye Kiss (12") Macola Record Co. 1987 
 Standing In The Rain (12") Spinnin' Records (US) 1989 
 Detroit Techno Soul (12") M.I.D. Records (Made In Detroit) 1991 
 Inequality (12") 430 West 1991 
 Serious Techno Vol.1 (12") Lafayette 1991 
 3MB Featuring Eddie 'Flashin' Fowlkes (CD) Tresor 1992 
 3MB Featuring Eddie 'Flashin' Fowlkes (2xLP) Tresor 1992 
 Mad In Detroit! EP (12") United Recordings 1992 
 Passion (12") Groove Kissing 1992 
 The Feeling / F.F. In Crime (12") Groove Kissing 1992 
 Time To Express (12") Lower East Side Records 1992 
 Turn Me Out (12") M.I.D. Records (Made In Detroit) 1992 
 I Wanna Know (12") Infonet 1993 
 I'm A Winner Not A Loser (12") Infonet 1993 
 Music In My Head / Macro (12") Pow Wow Records 1993 
 One Dance / Stella (12") Global Cuts 1993 
 The Birth Of Technosoul (CD) Tresor 1993 
 The Birth Of Technosoul (2x12") Tresor 1993 
 The Birth Of Technosoul (CD) Pow Wow Records 1993 
 Warwick (12") Global Cuts 1993 
 EP (12") City Boy 1994 
 Let Us Pray (Limited Edition) (12") Bold ! Soul Records 1995 
 Stella 2 (12") Peacefrog Records 1995 
 The Truth EP (12") Back To Basics 1995 
 Black Technosoul (CD) Tresor 1996 
 Groovin / C.B.R (12") Tresor 1996 
 City Dub 3 (12") City Boy 1997 
 Deep Pit (CD5") Dance Pool 1997 
 Deep Pit (12") Dance Pool 1997 
 Soul Train (12") Paper Recordings 1998 
 Oh Lord (12") Azuli Records 1999 
 Angel In My Pocket (2x12") Undaground Therapy Muzik 2000 
 My Soul (Archiv #05) (12") Tresor 2002

Citations

Works cited
 

1962 births
American techno musicians
African-American musicians
Living people
Musicians from Michigan
DJs from Detroit
21st-century African-American people